The American University in Dubai (AUD) is a private, non-sectarian institution of higher learning in Dubai, United Arab Emirates, founded in 1995. AUD is accredited regionally as a separate unit by the Southern Association of Colleges and Schools. AUD serves UAE nationals and international students from all over the world and offers them an American-style education.

AUD is accredited regionally by the UAE Ministry of Education and by the Southern Association of Colleges and Schools in the United States. Ranked 3rd as the world's most diverse university, AUD offers UAE nationals and international students an American-style education in one of the most vibrant and important cities in the world.

2019–2020 enrollment was around 2,000 students and over 110 nationalities are represented in the student body. AUD has a diverse faculty of over 120. AUD's curriculum is based on the US model of a liberal education that prepares students for successful careers and meaningful lives.

Campus
The American University in Dubai is situated next to Dubai Media City, Dubai Internet City, and the Palm Islands.

Academics
The university is organized into schools:
 School of Architecture, Art and Design
 Department of Architecture
 Department of Interior Design
 Department of Visual Communication
 School of Arts and Sciences
 Department of International Studies
 Department of Psychology
 Middle Eastern Studies
 School of Business Administration
 Department of Business and Economics
 Department of Finance and Accounting
 Department of Management
 Department of Marketing and Marketing Communications
 Mohammed bin Rashid School for Communication
  School of Education
 School of Engineering
 Department of Civil Engineering
 Department of Computer and Electrical Engineering
 Department of Mechanical Engineering

Serving the Community at large as a source of expertise from within the AUD faculty members, AUD's different centers offer services ranging from training and consultancy to research projects within their respective sectors.

Accreditation
The American University in Dubai (AUD) is accredited to grant bachelor's and master's degrees by the Southern Association of Colleges and Schools Commission on Colleges (SACSCOC), one of seven regional accrediting bodies in the United States. The American University in Dubai is officially licensed by the Ministry of Higher Education and Scientific Research of the United Arab Emirates. The Ministry has accredited all the university's programs.

AUD is authorized to operate by the State of Georgia Nonpublic Postsecondary Education Commission (NPEC). AUD's undergraduate majors in Marketing Communications and Advertising have been accredited by the International Advertising Association (IAA) in New York.

The American University in Dubai has received specialized accreditation for its business programs through the International Assembly for Collegiate Business Education (IACBE), located in Olathe, Kansas. The business programs in the following degrees are accredited by the IACBE: Bachelor of Business Administration (B.B.A.), with majors in Accounting, Economics, Finance, Management, Marketing and Marketing Communications; and the Master of Business Administration (M.B.A.), with concentrations in Finance and Marketing.

The Mohammed Bin Rashid School for Communication is accredited by the Accrediting Council on Education in Journalism and Mass Communications (ACEJMC).

Founding and history
Following the Gulf War in 1991, a team led by Elias Bou Saab from the American Intercontinental University (AIU) visited the Persian Gulf to establish relationships with various ministries of higher education as well as the region's schools.

The lack of quality private education at the university level, coupled with an appreciation of the American model of higher education, led them to conduct a feasibility study on the prospects of establishing an American university in the Persian Gulf. The results confirmed the high level of interest and desire for a campus offering an American-accredited educational curriculum.

It also became quickly apparent that the Emirate of Dubai, in the United Arab Emirates, would be an ideal place to locate such an institution. Dubai was found to be a politically stable, cosmopolitan and outward-looking principality whose nearly non-existent private sector in higher education was just beginning to draw some attention.

Elias Bou Saab moved to Dubai in 1995 in order to officially establish the American University in Dubai, which in turn would not have been possible without the commitment and support from the outset of Sheikh Mohammed Bin Rashid Al Maktoum, Vice President and Prime Minister of the UAE, Ruler of Dubai. To this day, he continues his unlimited support for higher education in general and to the university in particular.

The American University in Dubai opened its doors in October 1995 as a branch campus of the American Intercontinental University, a multinational educational institution currently based in Atlanta, Georgia.

AUD's initial enrollment was 165 students, over half of which were females. By the time former Secretary of State and Treasury James Baker gave the Keynote at AUD's first commencement in 1998, enrollment had climbed to 499; and the Dubai government, as an expression of confidence, had decided to build a campus of 1,400,000 square feet for use by the university. AUD moved out of its initial premises to occupy this new, spacious, fully equipped campus in January 2000. Its enrollment at that time was 687.

The year 2000 was also significant because it was in that year that the university was officially licensed by the UAE Ministry of Higher Education and Scientific Research (MOHE). The private sector for higher education had grown considerably since AUD's founding, and the Ministry saw fit to establish a formal licensure and (subsequently) accreditation process. It was in 2000 that AUD's largest academic department – Business Administration – was organizationally designated as a School.  In 2001, a memorandum of understanding was signed between the American University in Dubai (AUD) and the Georgia Institute of Technology of Atlanta, GA to establish a School of Engineering.  Representatives from Georgia Tech, including six senior faculty and administrative officers, visited AUD to finalize the adaptation of curricula to the requirements of the UAE.

In December 2007, and for the third time since its opening in 1995, The American University in Dubai achieved independent accreditation from the Southern Association of Colleges and Schools Commission on Colleges (SACSCOC), one of America's seven regional accrediting commissions.

The American University in Dubai also maintains an exchange program with the Georgia Institute of Technology in Atlanta, GA.  Students from both institutions can take courses and receive credit through the exchange program.

See also

Americans in the United Arab Emirates
University of Wollongong in Dubai
American University in Cairo (AUC)
American University of Beirut (AUB)
American University of Iraq, Sulaimani (AUIS)
American University of Kuwait (AUK)
American University of Sharjah (AUS)
American University in the Emirates (AUE)

References

External links

 
Universities and colleges in Dubai
Universities and colleges accredited by the Southern Association of Colleges and Schools
Educational institutions established in 1995
Private universities and colleges in the United Arab Emirates
Dubai International Academic City
1995 establishments in the United Arab Emirates